An independence referendum was held in the South African Bantustan of Ciskei on 4 December 1980. Over 99% of voters voted in favour, and Ciskei was declared independent in 1981 after the Status of Ciskei Act, 1981 was passed by the South African government. The results of the referendum were pronounced on 17 December.

Results

References

Ciskei
Ciskei
Ciskei
Referendums in South Africa
Ciskei